Mira Marjut Johanna Potkonen (née Miettinen, born 17 November 1980) is a Finnish lightweight boxer. She won a bronze medal in the 60 kg category at the 2016 AIBA Women's World Boxing Championships and the 2016 Summer Olympics, the latter being Finland's only medal at the games.

Career

2016 Summer Olympics

In the second round of competition, the quarterfinals, of lightweight boxing at the 2016 Summer Olympics in August 2016, Potkonen defeated the 2012 Olympic gold medalist in the event, Katie Taylor and advanced to the next round of competition, the semifinals. By the end of competition, Potkonen won the bronze medal in the event. It was the only medal for Finland at the 2016 Summer Olympics in any sport, and the first medal in boxing for the country at an Olympic Games since the 1992 Summer Olympics.

2020 Summer Olympics

Ahead of the 2020 Summer Olympics, company Gracenote released its medal count predictions for the year's Olympic Games including a prediction that Potkonen would win the silver medal in lightweight boxing. At the 2020 European Boxing Olympic Qualification Tournament, Potkonen lost to Caroline Dubois in the first round of competition and did not qualify for the 2020 Olympic Games. She qualified to 2020 Olympic Games based on ranking.

Legacy
Potkonen's Olympic bronze medal at the 2016 Summer Olympics in Rio de Janeiro, Brazil made her a flag-bearer symbol for more conventional summer sports in her home country of Finland, where sports such as ice hockey tend to be more popular activities.

In 2020, Potkonen was highlighted by the International Olympic Committee for the impact she has had as an inspiration for young female boxers from nations not as well-known for boxing, including teenager Mariah Bahe looking to fight representing the Navajo Nation at the 2024 Summer Olympics.

References

External links

1980 births
Boxers at the 2016 Summer Olympics
Finnish women boxers
Living people
Olympic boxers of Finland
People from Heinävesi
Olympic bronze medalists for Finland
Olympic medalists in boxing
Medalists at the 2016 Summer Olympics
Medalists at the 2020 Summer Olympics
Boxers at the 2020 Summer Olympics
Boxers at the 2015 European Games
Boxers at the 2019 European Games
European Games medalists in boxing
European Games gold medalists for Finland
AIBA Women's World Boxing Championships medalists
Lightweight boxers
Sportspeople from South Savo